The flag of the Commonwealth of Nations is the official flag used by and representing the Commonwealth of Nations. Its current design dates to 2013, a modification of a design adopted in 1976.

Description
The flag consists of the Commonwealth symbol in gold on a blue field.  The symbol centres on a globe, representing the global nature of the Commonwealth and the breadth of its membership.

History

The flag developed from car pennants produced for the first time at the 1973 Commonwealth Heads of Government Meeting, held in Ottawa, Ontario.  The initiative for its design is credited to two Canadians: the first Commonwealth Secretary-General, Arnold Smith; and Prime Minister Pierre Trudeau.  It was officially adopted on 26 March 1976.

Original design

The original design featured a globe surrounded by 64 radiating, approximately quadrilateral, sunrays, which form a 'C' for 'Commonwealth'.  The number of sunrays did not represent the number of member states (there have never been 64 members); instead, the large number represented the many ways in which the Commonwealth cooperates around the world. This flag used Pantone 286.

2013 redesign
In 2013, the globe was tilted, and the number of sunrays reduced to 34. The colourings used in the flag were also slightly modified. The standard proportions of the flag are 3:5, however a 1:2 version appears in countries whose flags use a 1:2 ratio, such as Australia and the UK. This flag used Pantone 280.

Usage
The flag of the Commonwealth of Nations is flown at Marlborough House, London, the headquarters of the Commonwealth Secretariat, throughout the year, and for a limited period at other venues where Commonwealth meetings, events, or visits are taking place (for example, Commonwealth Heads of Government Meetings). The Canadian federal government does not stipulate that the flag be flown for Commonwealth Day, instead directing that the British Union Jack (officially called the Royal Union Flag) be flown at federal installations which have a second flagpole.

Former Commonwealth Secretary-General Don McKinnon encourages the flying of the Commonwealth flag on Commonwealth Day, and the Office of the Secretary-General notes that "it is not the case that the Union Jack – or the flag of any other member country for that matter – is a substitute for the Commonwealth flag which represents the association of 53 members and their peoples."

Elsewhere, the Commonwealth flag is flown at the Scottish Parliament Building in Edinburgh on Commonwealth Day, from the fourth flagpole in addition to the Union Flag, the Scottish saltire and the European Union flag which all fly daily. Since 2002 the Commonwealth flag has been flown alongside the Union Flag, over the Northern Ireland Assembly's home at Parliament Buildings Stormont every Commonwealth Day. It is also flown on Commonwealth Day in the territory of Gibraltar, from the third flagpole alongside the Union Flag and the Flag of Gibraltar, which fly on the roof of No. 6 Convent Place, the office of the Chief Minister of Gibraltar.

On 28 September 2016, the Welsh Conservative AM in the National Assembly for Wales Mohammad Asghar suggested that once the United Kingdom leaves the European Union, the Welsh Assembly should replace the EU Flag alongside the Union Flag and the Welsh Flag. It has been suggested that the Flag of the Commonwealth be the replacement. On 31 January 2020 Brexit was marked at the Gibraltar border with the lowering of the EU flag and the raising of the Commonwealth flag in its place.

Gallery

Commonwealth Games

References

External links

Commonwealth Secretariat webpage on the Commonwealth Symbol and Flag

Flag
Commonwealth Of Nations
Commonwealth Of Nations